The 21st Biathlon European Championships were held in Nové Město na Moravě, Czech Republic from January 29 to February 4, 2014.

There were total of 15 competitions held: sprint, pursuit and individual both for U26 and U21, relay races for U26 and a mixed relay for U21.

Schedule of events 
The schedule of the event stands below. All times in CET.

Results

U26

Men's
It was the first time ever at the Biathlon European Championships when two sportsmen ranked the same podium place - Andrejs Rastorgujevs and David Komatz in sprint.

Women's
Audrey Vaillancourt from Canada became the first ever non-European biathlete to win a race at the Open Biathlon European Championships. Before that two Kazakh biathletes (Irina Moszewitina won a silver and Olga Dudczenko won a bronze medal in junior's individual race in 2005) and one American biathlete (Lowell Bailey won two bronze medals in the junior sprint and pursuit in 2001) had won medals. Victoria Padial from Spain became the first biathlete from her country to win a medal at the Biathlon European Championships (A Spanish biathlete has never won a medals at the Winter Olympics or World Championships). Mona Brorsson became the first Swedish biathlete to win a race at the Biathlon European Championships.

U21

Men's
Rene Zahkna won first ever medal for Estonia at this kind of championships.

Women's

Mixed

Medal table

Participating countries
33 nations competed

References

External links 
 Official webpage
 Nove Mesto Ready for another Major Event

Biathlon European Championships
International sports competitions hosted by the Czech Republic
2014 in biathlon
2014 in Czech sport